Pavel Kudryavtsev (born 5 September 1997) is a Russian professional ice hockey player who is currently playing for HC Dynamo Moscow in the Kontinental Hockey League (KHL)

Kudryavtsev originally made his KHL debut with Lokomotiv Yaroslavl in the 2016–17 season. After parts of five seasons in the KHL with hometown club, Lokomotiv, Kudryavtsev left to sign a two-year contract with 
Dynamo Moscow of the KHL on 2 May 2022.

References

External links

1997 births
HC Dynamo Moscow players
HC Lada Togliatti players
HC Ryazan players
Living people
Lokomotiv Yaroslavl players
Sportspeople from Yaroslavl